The Grammy Award for Best Bluegrass Album is an award presented at the Grammy Awards, a ceremony that was established in 1958 and originally called the Gramophone Awards, to recording artists for quality works (songs or albums) in the bluegrass music genre. Honors in several categories are presented at the ceremony annually by the National Academy of Recording Arts and Sciences of the United States to "honor artistic achievement, technical proficiency and overall excellence in the recording industry, without regard to album sales or chart position".

Originally called the Grammy Award for Best Bluegrass Recording (Vocal or Instrumental), the award was first presented to Bill Monroe in 1989. In 1990 and 1991, the category was renamed Best Bluegrass Recording, and in 1990, the award was reserved for singles rather than albums. Since 1992, the award has been presented under the category Best Bluegrass Album. Beginning in 1993, award recipients often included the producers, engineers, and/or mixers associated with the nominated work in addition to the recording artists. In 1995 and 1997, producers of compilation albums were the only award recipients.

As of 2012, Alison Krauss holds the record for the most wins in this category, having won six times (five times with the band Union Station). The group consisting of Ricky Skaggs and Kentucky Thunder has been presented five awards. Two-time recipients include Jim Lauderdale as well as the Nashville Bluegrass Band. The award has been presented to artists or groups originating from the United States each year to date. The Seldom Scene has the record for the most nominations without a win, with five.

In 2018, for the first time in the history of the category, there was a tie, resulting in both Rhonda Vincent and The Infamous Stringdusters winning the award.

Recipients

 Each year is linked to the article about the Grammy Awards held that year.
 Awards were presented to Jerry Douglas and Tut Taylor as the producers of the album.
 An award was presented to Todd Phillips as the producer of the album.

See also
 International Bluegrass Music Hall of Fame
 List of Grammy Award categories

References

General
  Note: User must select the "American Roots" category as the genre under the search feature.

Specific

 
1989 establishments in the United States
Album awards
Awards established in 1989
Bluegrass Album